Ramapurathu Warrier (1703–1753) is considered to be the pioneer of the "Vanchippattu" or Boat song form of poetry in Malayalam language. Vanchippattu is a poetic form of folk origin composed entirely in the Dravidian metre nathonnata. He was born in the year 1703 at Kottayam District, Kerala.

He was born in Ramapuram, near Palai, in Meenachil Taluk, Kottayam District, Kerala. His real name was Sankaran. He was a courtier of two successive Kings of Travancore, viz. Marthanda Varma and Dharma Raja.

The most celebrated work of Ramapurathu Warrier is Kuchelavritham Vanchippattu, which depicts the story of Kuchela, a devotee and an old classmate of Krishna, going to Dwaraka to meet with him. Also he wrote the  Kuchelavritham Vanchippattu in "Nathonatha" The poem was apparently composed and recited during one of the King Marthanda Varma's boat journeys in which Warrier was also present. While describing with great poignance the poverty of Kuchnevolence of Krishna, Warrier was indirectly presenting his miseries before the King seeking the King's help. It was only when he returned home, he realized that, instead of his ruined house another large house had been built on the instructions of the Maharaja Marthanda Varma.

Although composed more than two centuries ago, the poem is still one of the most popular poems of Malayalam language. An annotated edition was published by DC Books.

References 

 Kuchela Vrittam - Ramapurathu Varier - Annotated by Prof. Gopikuttan; Published by DC Books, Kottayam; .

Malayalam poets
1703 births
1753 deaths
People from Kottayam district
Poets from Kerala
18th-century Indian poets
Indian male poets
People of the Kingdom of Travancore
18th-century male writers